The Hammudid dynasty were an Arab dynasty of Idrisid origin in al-Andalus during the Taifa period (1016-1057). they ruled over Málaga and Ceuta and extended their domain to Algeciras. The first three members of the dynasty took the title of caliph in Córdoba, competing with the last Umayyads. The dynasty disappeared after the absorption of its territory by the Zirids of Granada (1057). They are most notable for being the only known Shi'a dynasty to emerge in al-Andalus.

The dynasty
The dynasty is named after their ancestor, Hammud, a descendant of Idris ibn Abdallah, founder of the Idrisid dynasty and great-grandchild of Hasan, son of Fatimah and Ali and grandson of the Islamic prophet, Muhammad. When Sulayman ibn al-Hakam carved out Andalusian land for his Berber allies, two members of the Hammudid family were given the governorship of Algeciras, Ceuta and Tangier. The Hammudids thus gained control of the traffic across the Straits of Gibraltar, suddenly becoming a powerful force. Claiming to act on behalf of the dethroned Hicham II, the Hammudid governor of Ceuta Ali ibn Hammud al-Nasir marched upon Córdoba in the year 1016, where he was crowned Caliph.

In 1056, the last Hammudid Caliph was dethroned, losing Málaga to the Zirids of Granada, who had previously been the Hammudids' most important supporters. The Hammudi family was then forced to settle in Ceuta.

History 
When the troops of the Umayyad Caliph Al-Hakam al-Mustansir, commanded by the vizier Almanzor, defeated the Idrisids in Morocco, the Ghomara tribes swore allegiance to the Caliph. The Idrissids were dispersed among the Berber tribes where they hid. Hammūd the eponym of the dynasty who claimed Idrisid ancestry was mixed with the Berbers recruited by the vizier Almanzor. Hammūd's two sons, `Alī ben Hammūd and Al-Qāsīm then distinguished themselves at the head of the Berber troops that overthrew the caliph Hichām in favor of his distant nephew Sulayman (1013). The new caliph, who took the title of Al-Musta'īn, was only the puppet of the vizier Almanzor, who held all the powers. Sulayman distributes commands to those who helped him in his seizure of power. `Alī ben Hammūd receives Tangier and northern Morocco. His older brother Al-Qāsīm al-Ma'mūn receives Algeciras.

`Alī ben Hammūd 
Alī ben Hammūd was at first a faithful servant of the caliph, then he revolted and moved to Spain. Taking advantage of the Caliph's weakness, he proclaimed himself independent and seized Malaga. He headed for Cordoba at the head of a large army, accompanied by his brother Al-Qāsīm al-Ma'mūn. Caliph Sulayman was quickly defeated, taken prisoner and then put to death, and `Alī proclaimed himself caliph with the title of Al-Nāsir "The Victorious" (July 7, 1016).

Al-Qāsīm al-Ma’mūn 
Having become unpopular, on April 17, 1018 `Alī was discovered murdered in his bath. His brother al-Qāsīm becomes caliph with the title of al-Ma'mūn "He who is trusted" after `Abd al-Rahman briefly attempts to restore the Umayyad dynasty. Al-Qāsīm was overthrown by his nephew Yahyā, son `Alī ben Hammūd (1021). He had received from his father, the government of Tangier. He crossed into Spain with the Ghomaras troops who had put his father in power, to contest it with his uncle.

Yahyā al-Mu`talī 
In 1018, upon the death of his father Ali bin Hammud al-Nasir, he was succeeded by his uncle Al-Qāsīm. Yahyā did not accept this appointment.

The quarrel between the two parents was to be prolonged when Yahyā gave the order to strangle his uncle held captive in Malaga on suspicion of preparing a coup. Yahyā then reigned over Malaga, Algeciras, Ceuta, but in Cordoba the inhabitants chose as caliph `Abd al-Rahman brother of the Umayyad Muhammad Al-Mahdī. `Abd al-Rahman took the title of Al-Mustazhir. Yahyā was no longer caliph, but he continued his rule in Malaga and Algeciras.

At the end of 1035, Yahyā felt strong enough to take revenge on the Cadi of Seville. He left to lay siege to that city. In this hasty campaign, Yahyā is killed (1035).

The Hammudite emirs 
The news of Yahyā's death caused unspeakable joy in both Seville and Cordoba, and the cadi had nothing more to fear from the Hammudites. Idrīs a brother of Yahyā was indeed proclaimed caliph at Malaga under the name of Al-Muta'ayyid and at the same time his cousin was proclaimed caliph at Algeciras under the name of Al-Mahdī. The caliphate was then established in the city of Al-Mu'min.

During this period the power of the Zirid amirs of Granada, vassals of the Hammudites, developed thanks, among other things, to the wise policy of the Jewish vizier Samuel ibn Nagrela.

Idrīs died of illness in 1039.

Two candidates were vying for the succession: Yahyā al-Qa`im son of Idrīs and his first cousin Al-Hassan al-Mustansī son of Yahyā al-Mu`talī. The latter was in Africa and when his fleet appeared before Malaga Yahyā al-Qa`im fled. Hasan pretended to forgive him but killed him soon after (1040). Al-Hasan is poisoned by his wife, sister of the deceased Yahyā al-Qa`im, who thus avenges her brother (1043).

In this case, Nadja, the eunuch vizier of Al-Hasan who had brought him to power, thought to take power for himself. He sets out to take Algeciras held by Muhammad al-Mahdī, son of al-Qāsīm al-Mā'mūn, since the death of his first cousin Yahyā al-Mu`talī. Najah was killed during this campaign (February 5, 1043)).

Idrīs II al-`Alī, brother of al-Hasan took over at Malaga. Idrīs II was a peaceful ruler, but some found him too weak. Muhammad, a cousin of Idrīs II, son of Idrīs I al-Muta'ayyid, was pushed to power by the African military (1047). This new ruler was the exact opposite of Idrīs II. This new ruler was the exact opposite of the previous one; those who had found Idrīs too weak found Muhammad too severe.

A new coup was organized to restore Idrīs and overthrow Muhammad. Idrīs was nevertheless forced to take refuge in Africa, where he was received by the Berber governors of Tangier and Ceuta. The latter, fearing that their host would dispossess them, sent him back to Spain while continuing to call themselves his vassals. Idrīs found refuge in Ronda. The disgruntled people of Malaga called for help from the Zirid Badis ben Habus, who had been ruling over Granada since 1038. He seized Malaga in 1053, either for himself or on behalf of his suzerain Idrīs II, who had been ousted in 104721. The throne was taken by Muhammad al-Mahdī al-Mu`tarim, son of Idrīs I al-Muta'ayyid (1047), and then by Idris III al-Muwaffaq, son of Yahya II al-Qa`im (1053), for a very brief reign. Idrīs II al-`Alī was finally restored (1054). The latter was then very old and died in 1055. Muhammad al-Musta`lī, another son of Idrīs I al-Muta'ayyid, ascended the throne, but it was Badis who took complete power in Malaga in 1058, thus putting an end to the Hammudite dynasty.

References

Bibliography

 
11th-century Arabs
Shia dynasties
Dynasties in al-Andalus
Arabs from al-Andalus
Hasanid dynasties
Caliphate of Córdoba
11th century in Al-Andalus